Passion For Your Name is an album by worship artist Matt Redman. This was his second album, following his debut Wake Up My Soul.

The album was recorded at West Park Studios in Littlehampton, England with audio engineer Martin Smith.

The song "Better Is One Day" may concern a mystical experience—the Most Holy Trinity Inhabitation, mystical experience of many saints which perceive the physical, real and alive Presence of God in their heart. "For here my heart is satisfied within your presence"—the author wishes himself to die in order to see and experience God again in Paradise, his house and court, or "come once again to me", because "I've tasted and I've seen".

Track listing 
All songs written by Matt Redman, except where noted.

 Disc - Total Time: 54:12
"It's Rising Up" (Redman, Martin Smith) – 7:12
"The Cross Has Said It All" (Redman, Smith) – 3:41
"I Will Offer Up My Life" – 5:02
"Surely The Time Has Come" – 6:06
"Jesus, Is This Song of Love" – 3:35
"The Happy Song" (Smith) – 4:13
"Turned Me Around" – 5:23
"This Means I Love You" – 3:25
"Friend of Sinners" – 3:08
"Fill Us Up And Send Us Out" – 3:20
"Rags To Riches" – 3:08
"Better Is One Day" – 5:59

Personnel 
 Matt Redman – lead vocals, acoustic guitar
 Richard Causon – keyboards, Hammond organ, accordion
 Stuart Townend – additional keyboards
 Tim Jupp – acoustic piano (5, 6)
 Stuart Garrard – electric guitars, group vocals (1)
 Bryn Haworth – National acoustic guitar, additional electric guitars, lap steel guitar, acoustic guitars (5, 9)
 Martin Smith – mandolin, backing vocals, group vocals
 Andy Coughlan – bass (1-5, 7-12)
 Les Driscoll – bass (6)
 Martin Neil – drums (1-5, 7-12), percussion, drum programming
 Stewart Smith – drums (6)
 Graham Ord – harmonica
 Chris Haigh – violin
 Helen Burgess – backing vocals
 Jussy McLean – group vocals (1)
 Vanessa Freeman – backing vocals (2, 5, 12)
 Paul Carrack – backing vocals (3, 7, 10)

Production 
 Martin Smith – producer, recording, mixing  
 Les Moir – executive producer 
 Mike Pilavachi – executive producer 
 David Pytches – executive producer 
 Tim Jupp – additional engineer 
 James Kessell – art direction, design 
 Paul Yates – photography

Release details
1995, UK, Kingsway Records KMCD857, Release Date ? ? 1995, CD
2000, UK, Survivor Records SURCD040, Release Date 21 July 2000, CD (double CD with "Wake Up My Soul")

References

1995 albums
Matt Redman albums